Several political parties operate in Veneto.

The region's five largest parties are Liga Veneta–Lega Nord, the Democratic Party, the Brothers of Italy, Forza Italia and the Five Star Movement. In the latest regional election, held in September 2020, a coalition composed of Liga Veneta (which presented three lists: the official one, "Zaia for President" and "Venetian Autonomy List"), Forza Italia and  the Brothers of Italy won virtually 80% of the vote (with thee three lists sponsored by Liga Veneta alone gaining a two-thirds majority).

Parties

Major parties
More than 20% in the 2015 regional election (or at least 10 regional councillors):
Venetian League–Northern League (Łiga Vèneta–Lega Nord), including:
Zaia for President (Zaia Presidente)
Liga Veneta Repubblica (Łiga Vèneta Republica)

Medium parties
Between 4% and 20% in the 2015 regional election (or at least 5 regional councillors):
Democratic Party (Partito Democratico)
Brothers of Italy (Fratelli d'Italia)

Minor parties
Between 1% and 4% in the 2015 regional election (or at least 1 regional councillor):
Five Star Movement (Movimento Cinque Stelle)
Forward Italy (Forza Italia)
Union of the Centre (Unione di Centro)
Tosi List for Veneto (Lista Tosi per il Veneto)
Veneto We Want (Il Veneto che vogliamo)
Article One (Articolo Uno)
Italian Left (Sinistra Italiana)
Possible (Possibile)
Green Europe (Europa Verde)
Federation of the Greens (Federazione dei Verdi)
Solidary Democracy (Democrazia Solidale)
Party of Venetians (Partito dei Veneti)
Venetian Independence (Indipendenza Veneta)
We Are Veneto (Siamo Veneto)

Other Venetist parties
Venetian nationalism is a regional political movement which arose in Veneto in the 1980s. Minor Venetist parties include:
North-East Project (Progetto NordEst)
North-East Union (Unione NordEst)
Autonomous Veneto League (Liga Veneto Autonomo)
Veneto First (Prima il Veneto)
Venetian Left (Sanca Veneta)

A list of former and current Venetist political parties is available at Venetian nationalism.

See also
List of political parties in Italy

 
 
Veneto